Trachelyopterichthys taeniatus, the striped woodcat, is a species of driftwood catfish found in the upper Amazon River basin in the countries of Brazil, Peru and Venezuela.  It is also found as an aquarium fish.  It reaches a length of 15.0 cm.

References
 

Auchenipteridae
Fish described in 1858
Fish of South America
Fish of Brazil
Fish of Peru
Taxa named by Rudolf Kner